Merkén or merquén (from the Mapuche mezkeñ [ or merkeñ [) is a smoked chili pepper (or in Spanish, ají) used as a condiment that is often combined with other ingredients when in ground form. Merkén is a traditional condiment in Mapuche cuisine in Chile.

Ingredients 
The base ingredient of merkén is the smoked pepper "cacho de cabra" (Capsicum annuum var. longum), a dried, smoked, red pepper that is sometimes ground with toasted coriander seed and salt.   The peppers are dried naturally in the sun and are then smoked over a wood fire. They are then stored by being hung to dry prior to grinding. Once reduced to powder or flakes, the peppers are often mixed with salt and roasted ground coriander seed.
 Commercially, merkén pepper with only an addition of salt is known as "natural merken" (merkén natural), while "special merkén" (merkén especial) contains coriander seeds. The composition of special merkén is about 70% chili, 20% salt, and 10% coriander seed.

Culinary use 
Merkén originates primarily from the cuisine of the Mapuches of the Araucanía Region of Chile, but is also used in the Chilean cuisine as a replacement for fresh chili. Since the beginning of the 21st century, merkén has drawn the attention of professional chefs and has begun to find an international market, at the same time, having a widespread use in Chilean cuisine. 

Merkén is most commonly used as:
 A general condiment for seasoning dishes such as lentils, gold potatoes, and sautéed vegetables
 A dry rub for tuna, lamb, pork, duck or beef
 A sprinkle, spice rub, or boiling spice for seafood including crab
 An addition to stews, savory pies, and purees
 A spice for ceviches
 An addition to cow or goat cheese
 An addition to peanuts or salty olives

See also

 List of smoked foods

References

Herb and spice mixtures
Food additives
Chilean cuisine
Mapuche cuisine